Bess Rogers is an American indie rock musician from New York City.

Early life and education
Rogers was born into a musical family on Long Island, New York, and attended the Conservatory of Music at the State University of New York at Purchase for recording and composition.

Career
Bess Rogers has released three full-length albums, two EPs, and several individual song releases.  She has released official music videos for four songs: Math and Science, Come Home, Favorite Day, and I Don't Worry.  She regularly tours nationally and internationally, plays at venues on the Lower East Side of Manhattan, and maintains a blog.  In 2012, Rogers' submission was selected from among a group of more 80 entries to update the classic Cheerios jingle "The One and Only."

In addition to her solo work, she has several side projects.  Most notably, she was part of the backup band for indie rocker Ingrid Michaelson.  In 2013 she formed the band The Secret Someones with Hannah Winkler, Lelia Broussard, and Zach Jones. She is also a member of the orchestral/electronic groups The Age of Rockets and The Robot Explosion.

Collaborations 
In 2016 Bess released an EP featuring 3-part harmonies with Allie Moss and Hannah Winkler titled Allie, Bess & Hannah Sing.

Discography
Decisions Based on Information (2007)Travel Back EP (2009)Bess Rogers presents Bess Rogers EP (2010)
Bess Rogers Presents: Songs Other People Wrote EP (2010)Out of the Ocean (2011)

Singles

Collaborations 
Allie, Bess, & Hannah Sing EP (2016)

Production
Bess' first three records, Decisions Based on Information, Travel Back and Bess Rogers Presents Bess Rogers, were produced by Dan Romer.  "Out of the Ocean" was produced by her husband and fellow Ingrid Michaelson band member Chris Kuffner.

External links
Bess Rogers' Official Website
Bess Rogers' Youtube Channel
Bess Rogers' Blog

See also
 List of people from New York
 List of State University of New York at Purchase people
 List of singer-songwriters

References

Musicians from New York City
Living people
Year of birth missing (living people)
People from Long Island